Krenglbach is a municipality in the district of Wels-Land in the Austrian state of Upper Austria.

Population

References

Cities and towns in Wels-Land District